Millingen is a railway station in Millingen (Rees), North Rhine-Westphalia, Germany. It lies on the Arnhem-Oberhausen railway. The train services are operated by VIAS.

Train services
The station is served by the following trains:

Regional services  Arnhem - Emmerich - Wesel - Oberhausen - Duisburg - Düsseldorf

Bus services

 61 (Rees - Empel-Rees - Millingen - Bocholt)
 63 (Millingen - Empel-Rees - Haldern - Wesel)
 87 (Rees - Empel-Rees - Millingen)

References

External links

NIAG Website 

Railway stations in North Rhine-Westphalia